Robert James Timlin (July 26, 1932 – January 17, 2017) was a United States district judge of the United States District Court for the Central District of California.

Education

Timlin earned his Artium Baccalaureus degree from Georgetown University in 1954, his Juris Doctor from Georgetown University Law Center in 1959, and his Master of Laws from Georgetown University Law Center in 1964.

Career

Prior to his federal appointment, Timlin served as Associate Justice of the 4th District Court of Appeal in California, the Municipal and Superior Court for Riverside County, Corona City Attorney, and as an Assistant United States Attorney. Prior to coming to California, Timlin worked as a Special Attorney for the United States Department of Justice, Criminal Division. He was appointed to the California Court of Appeal by Governor George Deukmejian and to the federal bench by President Bill Clinton.

Federal judicial service

Timlin was nominated by President of the United States Bill Clinton on April 26, 1994, to a new seat created by 104 Stat. 5089. He was confirmed by the United States Senate on September 14, 1994, and received his commission on September 15, 1994. Timlin assumed senior status on February 1, 2005, and remained in that status until his death on January 17, 2017.

Published works

 "Pitchess Motions Revisited", California Judicial Education and Research Journal, Spring, 1981
 Water Softeners Discharge, National Institute of Municipal Law Officers, January, 1973

Notable cases

 Buono v. Norton, 212 F. Supp. 2d 1202 (C.D. Cal. 2002), aff'd 371 F.3d 543 (9th Cir. 2004), on remand 364 F. Supp. 2d 1175 (C.D. Cal. 2005), aff'd sub nom. Buono v. Kempthorne, 527 F.3d 758 (9th Cir. 2008), cert. granted sub nom. Salazar v. Buono, 129 S. Ct. 1313 (U.S. 2009)

References

External links

1932 births
2017 deaths
Assistant United States Attorneys
California state court judges
Lawyers from Buffalo, New York
Georgetown University alumni
Georgetown University Law Center alumni
Judges of the California Courts of Appeal
Judges of the United States District Court for the Central District of California
Superior court judges in the United States
United States district court judges appointed by Bill Clinton
United States magistrate judges
20th-century American judges
21st-century American judges